,  (I with bowl) is an additional letter of the Latin alphabet. It was introduced in 1928 into the reformed Yañalif, and later into other alphabets for Soviet minority languages. Thus, this letter corresponds to the letter  in modern Turkic alphabets.

Usage 
The letter was originally included in the Yañalif, and later also included in the alphabets of the Kurdish, Abazin, Sami, Ingrian, Komi, Tsakhur, Azerbaijani and Bashkir languages, as well as in the draft reform of the Udmurt alphabet. During the project of the Latinization of the Russian language, this letter corresponded to the Cyrillic letter .

Encoding 
The letter I with bowl has not been adopted into Unicode, despite repeated applications, because of the concern that encoding it could open the door to “duplicating the whole Cyrillic alphabet as Latin letters”. The latest proposal was revised in response to this concern. Instead, computer users can substitute similar letters, either Ь ь or Ƅ ƅ (Latin letter tone six, the letter that was previously used in the Zhuang alphabet to denote the sixth tone ).

See also 
 Latinisation in the Soviet Union

References

Romanization
Latin alphabets
1928 establishments in the Soviet Union